Frederick Middleton (28 May 1883 – 21 July 1956) was an Australian cricketer who moved to New Zealand during his playing career. He played first-class cricket for New South Wales, Auckland and Wellington between 1905 and 1922.

See also
 List of Auckland representative cricketers
 List of New South Wales representative cricketers

References

External links
 

1883 births
1956 deaths
Australian cricketers
Auckland cricketers
New South Wales cricketers
Wellington cricketers
Pre-1930 New Zealand representative cricketers